Group B of the 1986 FIFA  World Cup was one of the groups of nations competing at the 1986 FIFA World Cup. The group's first round of matches began on 3 June and its last matches were played on 11 June. Matches were played at the Estadio Azteca in Mexico City and at the Estadio Nemesio Díez in Toluca. Host Mexico topped the group, joined in the second round by Belgium and by Paraguay, who were making their first appearance in the finals since 1958. Iraq, making their debut in the World Cup, lost all three of their matches and scored just one goal.

Standings

Matches

Belgium vs Mexico

Paraguay vs Iraq

Mexico vs Paraguay

Iraq vs Belgium

Paraguay vs Belgium

Iraq vs Mexico

References

Group B
Group
Belgium at the 1986 FIFA World Cup
Iraq at the 1986 FIFA World Cup
Group